Mezhdurechensky is an urban locality (an urban-type settlement) and the administrative center of Kondinsky District of Khanty-Mansi Autonomous Okrug, Russia. Population:

References

Urban-type settlements in Khanty-Mansi Autonomous Okrug